The men's marathon at the 1996 Summer Olympics in Atlanta, Georgia was held on Sunday August 4, 1996. The race started at 07:05h local time to avoid excessively hot and humid conditions. A total number of 111 athletes completed the race, with an injured and limping Abdul Baser Wasiqi from Afghanistan finishing in last position in 4'24:17.

There were 124 competitors from 79 countries. The maximum number of athletes per nation had been set at 3 since the 1930 Olympic Congress. Thirteen competitors did not finish. The medal ceremony took place during the Closing Ceremony which they did again in Athens eight years later. The event was won by Josia Thugwane of South Africa, the nation's first victory in the Olympic men's marathon since 1912. South Korea's Lee Bong-ju wins the silver, the first Asian to win an Olympic medal in this event and Erick Wainaina of Kenya added the country's medal tally by snatching the bronze.

Summary

There were few favorites in the event. The race started at an Olympic stadium and after 3 1/2 laps of the track they started on the out and back course through Atlanta. There was a large group of about 60 in front. It was not until mile 15 that things started to get stirred up. The South Africans made a wall at the front and proceeded to increase the pace. They were joined by Lee Bong-Ju. The race continued as such until mile 17. Josia Thugwane made a move and was joined by Lee Bong-Ju. Meanwhile, Erick Wainaina joined the two in front. The three switched leads several times until Thugwane made a move outside Olympic stadium. He took through the tunnel while Lee Bong-Ju passed the Kenyan. It was the closest finish in Olympic history but Thugwane maintained his lead in the last mile to take the gold medallion in 2:12:36. Lee Bong-Ju took silver and Wainaina bronze.

Background

This was the 23rd appearance of the event, which is one of 12 athletics events to have been held at every Summer Olympics. Returning runners from the 1992 marathon included bronze medalist Stephan Freigang of Germany, fifth-place finisher Salvatore Bettiol of Italy, eighth-place finisher Hiromi Taniguchi of Japan, and ninth-place finisher Diego García of Spain. Martín Fiz of Spain was the reigning World and European champion. Belayneh Dinsamo of Ethiopa was the world record holder, but that record had been set 8 years previously. As in 1992, there was "no dominant male marathoner entering the 1996 Olympics and the race was considered wide-open." 

Afghanistan, Andorra, Bosnia and Herzegovina, Burundi, Cambodia, Cape Verde, Indonesia, Kyrgyzstan, Lithuania, Mauritius, Moldova, Saint Vincent and the Grenadines, Trinidad and Tobago, Ukraine, Venezuela, and Yemen each made their first appearance in Olympic men's marathons. The United States made its 22nd appearance, most of any nation, having missed only the boycotted 1980 Games.

Competition format and course

As all Olympic marathons, the competition was a single race. The marathon distance of 26 miles, 385 yards was run over an out-and-back route starting and finishing at the Olympic Stadium. The course generally followed that of the Atlanta Marathon.

Records

These were the standing world and Olympic records prior to the 1996 Summer Olympics.

No new world or Olympic bests were set during the competition. The following national records were established during the competition:

Schedule

The Olympic marathon, usually scheduled for afternoons or evenings, began early in the morning in 1996 due to the anticipated heat and humidity of summer in Atlanta. The temperature by about 10 a.m. local time, as runners finished, was approximately 80° F. (26° C.) with 80% humidity.

All times are Eastern Daylight Time (UTC-4)

Results

See also
 1995 Men's World Championships Marathon
 1996 Marathon Year Ranking
 1997 Men's World Championships Marathon

Notes

References
  Official Report
  Marathon Info

M
Marathons at the Olympics
Marathons in the United States
1996 marathons
Men's marathons
Men's events at the 1996 Summer Olympics